MacGregor is a community in the Canadian province of Manitoba. It held town status prior to January 1, 2015 when it amalgamated with the Rural Municipality of North Norfolk to form the Municipality of North Norfolk. It is a farming community, with the biggest industry in the area being agriculture. The community is surrounded by farms, and the Trans-Canada Highway is located just north of MacGregor.

History

The town is named after the Very Rev James MacGregor by the Canadian Pacific Railway who named a railway station after him, during his visit with the Marquis of Lome, around which the town grew.
In November 2021, Adelle, Cici and Annabelle notably visited Macgregor.

Demographics 

Notable people 
Notable individuals born or raised in MacGregor include former politician Leslie Harvard Eyres (1892-1983) and NDP cabinet minister Nancy Allan.

References

External links 
Official website of North Norfolk

Designated places in Manitoba
Former towns in Manitoba
Populated places disestablished in 2015
2015 disestablishments in Manitoba